The 1960 United States presidential election in Kansas took place on November 8, 1960, as part of the 1960 United States presidential election. Voters chose eight representatives, or electors, to the Electoral College, who voted for president and vice president.

Kansas was won by incumbent Vice President Richard Nixon (R–California), running with United States Ambassador to the United Nations Henry Cabot Lodge, Jr., with 60.45% of the popular vote, against Senator John F. Kennedy (D–Massachusetts), running with Senator Lyndon B. Johnson, with 39.10% of the popular vote.

Kennedy carried only heavily Catholic Ellis County and urbanized Wyandotte County, the home of Kansas City, Kansas, which has become the Democrats' most reliable county in Kansas during presidential elections.

With 60.45% of the popular vote, Kansas would prove to be Nixon's second strongest state in the 1960 election after Nebraska.

Results

Results by county

See also
 United States presidential elections in Kansas

References

Kansas
1960
1960 Kansas elections